Scoparia philippinensis is a moth in the family Crambidae. It is found in the Philippines (Negros).

References

Moths described in 1917
Scorparia